Besma endropiaria, the straw besma, is a species of geometrid moth in the family Geometridae.

The MONA or Hodges number for Besma endropiaria is 6884.

References

Further reading

 

Ourapterygini
Articles created by Qbugbot
Moths described in 1867